Rebecca Blumenstein is a journalist. She was named President - Editorial of NBC News on January 10, 2023. Prior to that, Blumenstein was one of the highest-ranking women in the newsroom at The New York Times. She is the Chair of the Board of the Columbia Journalism Review.

Biography 
Blumenstein attended the University of Michigan, where she studied for her bachelor's degree in economics and social science while serving as editor in chief of the Michigan Daily.

Blumenstein started her career at the Tampa Tribune, and then contributed to Gannett Newspapers and Newsday. Blumenstein started working for the Wall Street Journal in 1995 as a reporter for Detroit covering General Motors, then began covering China in 2005. She became The Wall Street Journal's Deputy Editor in Chief in January 2013. After more than two decades at The Wall Street Journal, Blumenstein joined The New York Times as the Deputy Managing Editor in February 2017, making her one of the highest ranking women in the newsroom.

Blumenstein has reported on General Motors, Detroit, AT&T Corp., WorldCom Inc., the New York State legislature, China, and mergers in the telecommunications industry. In 1993, she won the New York Newswomen's Award for coverage of the Long Island Railroad shootings. In 2003, her team won the Gerald Loeb Award for coverage of WorldCom. In 2007, her team in China won the Pulitzer Prize for International Reporting. In 2009, she was named to Aspen Institute's Henry Crown Fellowship. She received the Gerald Loeb Award's 2015 Minard Editor Award for career contributions to business journalism.

References 

American women editors
American women journalists
American newspaper journalists
Living people
Henry Crown Fellows
University of Michigan College of Literature, Science, and the Arts alumni
20th-century American journalists
21st-century American journalists
Gerald Loeb Award winners for Deadline and Beat Reporting
Minard Editor Award winners
Year of birth missing (living people)
The Michigan Daily alumni
20th-century American women
21st-century American women